Intelsat VA F-14, was a communications satellite operated by Intelsat. Launched in 1986, it was the fourteenth of fifteen Intelsat V satellites to be launched. The Intelsat V series was constructed by Ford Aerospace, based on the Intelsat VA satellite bus. Intelsat VA F-14 was part of an advanced series of satellites designed to provide greater telecommunications capacity for Intelsat's global network.

Satellite 
The satellite was box-shaped, measuring 1.66 by 2.1 by 1.77 metres; solar arrays spanned 15.9 metres tip to tip. The arrays, supplemented by nickel-hydrogen batteries during eclipse, provided 1800 watts of power at mission onset, approximately 1280 watts at the end of its seven-year design life. The payload housed 26 C-band and 6 Ku-band transponders. It could accommodate 15,000 two-way voice circuits and two TV channels simultaneously. It also provided maritime communications for ships at sea.

Launch 
The satellite was successfully launched into space on 31 May 1986, at 00:53:03 UTC, by means of an Ariane 2 vehicle from the Centre Spatial Guyanais, Kourou, French Guiana. It had a launch mass of 1981 kg. During the Ariane 2 maiden flight, the third stage had a partial ignition followed by another ignition above nominal pressure which led to the engine's failure and the destruction of the launcher.

Investigation 
Because the upper stage of the Ariane 2 was shared with the other Ariane rockets, all flights were suspended until 16 September 1987. As a result of an investigation into the ignition irregularities, it was decided that installing more powerful igniters would sufficiently rectify the issue.

References 

Spacecraft launched in 1986
Intelsat satellites
SES satellites